NWU may mean:

Nagoya Women's University, Japan
Nara Women's University, Japan
National Workers' Union (Dominica)
National Workers' Union (Guyana)
National Workers Union (Jamaica)
National Workers' Union (Trinidad & Tobago)
National Writers Union, an American trade union for freelance and contract writers
Nebraska Wesleyan University, a private liberal arts college in Lincoln, Nebraska
Northwestern University, a research institution in Evanston, Illinois 
Northwestern University (Philippines), a university in Laoag City, Ilocos Norte, Philippines
North-West University, a multi-campus institution in South Africa
Northwest University, China, a Chinese university located in Xi'an City, Shaanxi Province, China
Wii U, a 2012 Nintendo video game console (as in Nintendo Wii U)
Navy Working Uniform, one of the United States Navy's uniforms
N.W.U (album), a Japanese-language pop album by South Korean band F.T. Island